The Anne Frank Zentrum (Anne Frank Centre) is a facility located in Berlin, which is committed to working against anti-Semitism, prejudice and any kind of discrimination against people.

History 

The Anne Frank Zentrum in Berlin was founded in 1994 as a response to the international travelling exhibition "The world of Anne Frank. 1929-1945". This exhibition was shown in six boroughs of the city and marked the 50th anniversary of the liberation from Nazism. To support the coordination of the exhibition and the extensive accompanying programme a Society of Friends was founded.

From this organisation, the Anne Frank Zentrum in Berlin was founded, supported by the existing Anne Frank Centres in Great Britain, acting as guides.

Through a cooperation agreement with the Anne Frank House in Amsterdam, the Anne Frank Zentrum was opened on 12 June 1998. Since September 2002, the Anne Frank Zentrum has been based next to the Hackesche Höfe at 39 Rosenthaler Strasse in Berlin.

Exhibition in Berlin 

On 4 November 2006 a new permanent exhibition "Anne Frank. Here & Now" opened, telling the personal life story of Anne Frank and how her tale connects to the world she lived in. It incorporates modern reflections from Berlin's young people into the work.

Touring exhibitions
Anne Frank Zentrum also invests in touring exhibitions to encourage the examination of history but also of topics such as democracy and human rights on a more national and global level. The centre takes an active role against right wing extremism in Germany.

References

External links 
 

Non-profit organisations based in Berlin
Anne Frank
Culture in Berlin
Museums in Berlin